Kelly Michaels might refer to: 

Ruth Copeland (b. 1946). English-American singer. 
Margaret Kelly Michaels, defendant in the Wee Care Nursery School abuse trial.